Sankulani is a town in southern Malawi.

Transport 

It is served by a station on the southern line of the national railway system which connects with Mozambique.  The railway in this stretch is closely following the border with Mozambique.  Also near this station, the railway leaves the plains to the south and enters the mountains to the north.

Namesake 

There is another town in Malawi with this name.

See also 

 Railway stations in Malawi

References 

Populated places in Malawi